SMath Studio is a freeware (free of charge, but not libre), closed-source, mathematical notebook program similar to Mathcad. It is available for Windows, Linux, iOS, Android, Universal Windows Platform, and on some handhelds.

Among its capabilities are:
 Solving differential equations;
 Graphing functions in two or three dimensions;
 Symbolic calculations, including solving systems of equations;
 Matrix operations, including determinants;
 Finding roots of polynomials and functions;
 Symbolic and numeric differentiation of functions;
 Numeric integration;
 Simple multiline looped programs;
 User-defined functions;
 Units of measurement.

References

External links

 

Computer algebra systems